Chowne is a surname. Notable people with the surname include:

 Albert Chowne (1920–1945), Australian army officer
 Charles Tilson-Chowne (born 1881), British actor
 George Chowne, English politician
 Henry Chowne ( 1613–1668), English politician

See also
 chown, a computer command